Serafim Pinto Ribeiro Júnior (10 December 1915 – 4 July 2001), known as Pipi, was a Brazilian footballer. He played in three matches for the Brazil national football team in 1942. He was also part of Brazil's squad for the 1942 South American Championship.

References

External links
 

1915 births
2001 deaths
Brazilian footballers
Brazil international footballers
Place of birth missing
Association footballers not categorized by position